The Insaints were an American punk rock group from Modesto and later San Francisco, California, United States, fronted by controversial vocalist Marian Anderson from 1988-1994. She was noted for her powerful, sexually charged and provocative live performances which frequently included on-stage nudity and sex acts. The Insaints made Bay Area headlines when Anderson was arrested for lewd conduct after a performance at 924 Gilman Street in Berkeley, California. The charges were eventually dropped after a year long legal battle, but the band broke up in 1994. In 2001, Anderson died of a heroin overdose at the age of 33.

In 2005, the group reformed under the same name with Eva Von Slut as its new vocalist.

A documentary about the Insaints and the life of vocalist Marian Anderson, entitled Last Fast Ride: The Life, Love, and Death of a Punk Goddess directed by Lilly Scourtis Ayers and narrated by Henry Rollins, was released in February 2011. It features interviews with Insaints guitarist Daniel DeLeon, and Bay Area musicians Tim Armstrong of Rancid, Dexter Holland of The Offspring, Texas Terri Laird, and other assorted Gilman Street veterans as well as photos and footage of the band in action.

Post-breakup
After the Insaints broke up, Anderson played guitar and sang backups in local San Francisco band The Ritalins with John Kiffmeyer (or Al Sobrante) on drums, "Rotten" Ron Ready on bass, and Josh Donald on vocals. The Ritalins performed in and around the Bay Area for almost two years where they were noted mainly for their chaotic and unpredictable shows.

Shortly before her death in 2001, singer Anderson and Insaints guitarist Deleon formed a psychobilly band called The Thrillkillers. The group's only performance was in September 2001.

Marian Anderson is survived by her daughter, Hannah Lolly Anderson.

As of 2012, Daniel DeLeon is active in the psychobilly band Rezurex and gothic rock/new wave band Neon Kross.

Eva Von Slut is a burlesque performer and has fronted the psychobilly band Thee Merry Widows, as well as the punk band The White Barons.

Recordings
Before their breakup in 1994, The Insaints had only one official release; Diesel Queens vs. Insaints, a split, double 7-inch EP with The Diesel Queens from San Jose, California, released by Maximum RocknRoll in 1993.

On November 9, 2004 the six tracks from the 1993 EP, along with the four other outtakes from the 1993 recording and nine additional live tracks, were collected and released as a full-length album called Sins of Saints on the Disaster Records label.

Discography
Diesel Queens vs. Insaints (Split 7 inch w/ the Diesel Queens) (1993)
Sins of Saints (LP/CD) (2004)

References

External links
 Insaints MySpace page
 Last Fast Ride Official Movie Page

Punk rock groups from California
Musical groups from San Francisco